This is a list of South African football transfers for the 2009–10 season.

Clubs

AmaZulu
In: 
 Nick Gindre - AFC Wimbledon   
 Warren Bishop - Pretoria University

Out: 
 Sean Dundee 
 Nhlakanipho Mkhize 
 Bonga Mogale 
 Momikia Yemo 
 Sanele Majola

Notes and references

South African
Tran
South African